Dolichocolon is an abnormally long large intestine. It should not be confused with an abnormally wide large intestine, which is called a megacolon.

Dolichocolon may predispose to abnormal rotation (see volvulus) and interposition between the diaphragm and the liver (see Chilaiditi syndrome). It is more commonly seen in the elderly, some psychiatric patients or in institutionalised individuals. It is not, however, a part of normal aging. The exact cause remains unknown.Dolichocolon is often an incidental finding on abdominal X-rays or colonoscopy. It is not by itself a disease and as such requires no treatment. The term is from ancient Greek dolichos, the long distance in running, and colon.

References

External links 

Gastroenterology
Congenital disorders of digestive system